The 1975 Cleveland Indians season was a season in American baseball. It involved the Indians competing in the American League East, where they finished fourth with a record of 79–80.

Offseason 
One highlight of the season was the arrival of Frank Robinson to the club. Prior to the start of the season, the Indians named him player-manager, giving him distinction of being the first black manager in Major League Baseball history.

Notable transactions 
 February 25, 1975: Dave Duncan and Al McGrew (minors) were traded by the Indians to the Baltimore Orioles for Boog Powell and Don Hood.

Regular season

Season standings

Record vs. opponents

Notable transactions 
 May 20, 1975: Dick Bosman and Jim Perry were traded by the Indians to the Oakland Athletics for Blue Moon Odom and cash.
 June 3, 1975: Rick Cerone was drafted by the Indians in the 1st round (7th pick) of the 1975 Major League Baseball draft.
 June 7, 1975: Blue Moon Odom and a player to be named later were traded by the Indians to the Atlanta Braves for Roric Harrison. The Indians completed the deal by sending Rob Belloir to the Braves on June 16.
 June 13, 1975: Gaylord Perry was traded by the Indians to the Texas Rangers for Jim Bibby, Jackie Brown, Rick Waits, and $100,000.

Opening Day Lineup

Roster

Player stats

Batting
Note: G = Games played; AB = At bats; R = Runs scored; H = Hits; 2B = Doubles; 3B = Triples; HR = Home runs; RBI = Runs batted in; AVG = Batting average; SB = Stolen bases

Pitching
Note: W = Wins; L = Losses; ERA = Earned run average; G = Games pitched; GS = Games started; SV = Saves; IP = Innings pitched; R = Runs allowed; ER = Earned runs allowed; BB = Walks allowed; K = Strikeouts

Awards and honors 

All-Star Game
George Hendrick, reserve

Farm system

Notes

References 
1975 Cleveland Indians team page at Baseball Reference
1975 Cleveland Indians team page at www.baseball-almanac.com

Cleveland Indians seasons
Cleveland Indians season
Cincinnati Indians